The American Polar Society was founded in 1934 by August Howard.

Honorary members
Starting in 1936 the following explorers, arctic scientists and geographers have been honored:
David Legge Brainard (1936). He was the first to receive an honorary membership.
Richard Evelyn Byrd (1938).
Vilhjalmur Stefansson (1940).
Lincoln Ellsworth (1944).
Frank Debenham (1949). He died in 1965.
Paul Allman Siple (1957). He died in 1968.
Louise Arner Boyd (1959).
Finn Ronne (1960). 
Bernt Balchen (1966).
Laurence McKinley Gould (1969).
Thomas Charles Poulter (1973).
Richard B. Black (1979). He died in 1992.
Norman Dane Vaughan (1980).
Lincoln A. Washburn (1981).
Charles F. Passel (1982).
Thomas H. Manning (1983).
Conrad Shinn (1984).
Graham Westbrook Rowley (1985).
Waldo Kampmeier Lyon (1986)
William Robert Anderson (1987)
Joseph Otis Fletcher (1988)
Norbert Untersteiner (1989)
Max C. Brewer (1990).
James Francis Calvert (1991)
Martin Arthur Pomerantz (1992).
James R. Reedy (1993).
Beaumont Buck (1994).
David C. Nutt (1995).
Charles R. Bentley (1996).
Wilford Frank Weeks (1997). He was born in 1929.
Kenneth Utuayuk Toovak (1998).
Robert Hoxie Rutford (1998).
Anthony J. Gow (2004).
James Van Allen (2006).
Susan Solomon (2013).

References

External links

 
1934 establishments in New York (state)